Kenneth Eugene Jones (born December 1, 1952) is a former American football offensive lineman for the Buffalo Bills and New York Jets of the National Football League. He played high-school football at Pattonville High School and college football at Arkansas State University. Jones served as a head football coach at LaSalle High School in Niagara Falls, New York for several years.

External links
Old pro Jones at home on Falls High sidelines
NFL.com player page

1952 births
Living people
Players of American football from St. Louis
American football offensive tackles
Arkansas State Red Wolves football players
Buffalo Bills players
New York Jets players